Guelmim (in , in , also spelled in European sources: Glaimim, Goulimine or Guelmin), is a city in southern Morocco, often called Gateway to the Desert. It is the capital of the Guelmim-Oued Noun region which includes southern Morocco (south of the Souss-Massa region) and the northeastern corner of Western Sahara. The population of the city was 187,808 as of the 2014 Moroccan census, making it the largest city in the region. The N1 and N12 highways cross at Guelmim and link it to the nearby region of Souss-Massa.

Guelmim is located just north of Asrir, which was the site of an important trade-route city and the capital of the Saharan tribes. It was known in Arabic sources as Noul Lamta.

It is home to a camel market.

Most of the inhabitants speak either the Tachelhit language or the Hassaniya dialect of Arabic, as it is part of the Sahrawi-inhabited southern region of Morocco.

Climate
Guelmim has a hot desert climate (Köppen climate classification BWh).

See also
Beni Ḥassān
Noun River 
Maqil
Tekna

References

External links 

 Lexicorient 

Cities in Morocco
Municipalities of Morocco
Populated places in Guelmim Province
Guelmim
Regional capitals in Morocco